The Wolf is a 1916 Hungarian film directed by Michael Curtiz.

Plot summary

Cast
 Artúr Somlay as Dr. Kelemen Jenõ ügyvéd
 Frida Gombaszögi as Vilma, Kelemen felesége
 Victor Varconi as Szabó Gyuri (as Várkonyi Mihály)
 Lucy Doraine as (as Kovács Ilonka)
 Hermin Haraszti	
 Vilmos Lóránth (as Vilmos Lóránt)

References

External links
 

1916 films
Films directed by Michael Curtiz
Hungarian silent films
Hungarian black-and-white films
1916 Austro-Hungarian films